Genesis Yasmine Mohanraj, known by her stage name Tommy Genesis, is a Canadian rapper. In 2016, Dazed magazine described her as "the internet's most rebellious underground rap queen". Her music incorporates experimental style and often sexual verses. Her debut album titled Tommy Genesis was released in November 2018. Her second album Goldilocks X was released in September 2021.

Early life and education 
Genesis was born in Vancouver, Canada. She is of Malayali, Tamil and Swedish descent. She graduated from the Emily Carr University of Art and Design where she studied film and sculpture. Genesis is her birth name.

Career

Music 
Genesis started recording rap in 2013 as part of a project called G3NESIS. In 2015 Genesis signed with Awful Records and released her debut mixtape World Vision. In 2017 she signed with Downtown Records/Universal. She collaborated with Abra, another artist from Awful Records, on the track "Hair Like Water Wavy Like the Sea" from Genesis's debut mixtape World Vision.

On July 28, 2018, she released the single "100 Bad". This song is the second collaboration that Tommy made with the music producer Charlie Heat, with whom she previously collaborated on the 2017 song "Tommy". The song is featured on her debut album, Tommy Genesis through Downtown/The Orchard. Later, British singer-songwriter Charli XCX released a remix of "100 Bad" on September 7. Her debut album, Tommy Genesis was released on November 9, 2018.

In 2020, she collaborated with American experimental hip-hop artist JPEGMAFIA on his ep called EP!, on the track ROUGH 7.

In 2023, she appeared on Lana del Rey's ninth studio album Did You Know That There's a Tunnel Under Ocean Blvd on the 15th track, Peppers.

Fashion 
Tommy Genesis was recruited by Calvin Klein for their Fall 2016 campaign along with other musical artists. In 2017 she collaborated with rapper M.I.A. at Mercedes-Benz Fashion Week.

Lyricism 
Gender and sexuality are common themes in Genesis' music and she has described herself as a "fetish rapper". She is also an advocate against girl-on-girl cyberbullying.

Discography

Studio albums

Mixtapes

Singles

Guest appearances and collaborations 
 "Vamp" by Father, Who's Gonna Get Fucked First? (2015)
"Big Boi" by Abra, Princess EP (2016)
 Baby.Daddy. (EP, 2016)
"Enough" by Dakari ft. G-Eazy, Jozzy (2018)
"2pennies" by Lil West, Vex Part 1 (2019)
 "Rough 7" by JPEGMafia, EP! (2020)
 "Peppers" by Lana Del Rey, Did You Know That There's a Tunnel Under Ocean Blvd (2023)

Tours 
Headlining
 God is Wild Tour (2019)
Supporting
 Dua Lipa – The Self-Titled Tour (2018)
 Charli XCX – Charli Live Tour (2019)

References

External links 
Official website

Living people
21st-century Canadian rappers
Canadian women rappers
Date of birth missing (living people)
Canadian people of Swedish descent
Canadian people of Tamil descent
Downtown Records artists
Interscope Records artists
Canadian female models
1990 births
21st-century women rappers